The Nigerian fifty-naira note (₦ 50 or NGN 50) is a denomination of the Nigerian currency. When the note was introduced in October of 1991, it was the banknote with the highest denomination in Nigeria at the time.

References 

Currencies introduced in 1991
Currencies of Nigeria
Economy of Nigeria